The Details is a 2011 American independent black comedy film written and directed by Jacob Aaron Estes. It stars Tobey Maguire, Elizabeth Banks, Kerry Washington, Laura Linney, Ray Liotta and Jonah Hill as the narrator. The film premiered at the 2011 Sundance Film Festival and went into limited release on November 2, 2012.

Plot
Jeff Lang, an obstetric gynaecologist (OBGYN), and his wife Nealy, who owns a small shop, live in Seattle with their two-year-old son named Miles. Considering a second child, they decide to enlarge their small home and lay expensive new grass in their backyard. Worms in the grass attract raccoons, who destroy the grass, and Jeff goes to great lengths to get rid of the raccoons, mixing poison with a can of tuna. Their neighbor, Lila, tells Jeff that her cat Matthew is missing, and Jeff does not yet realize he may be responsible.

After arguing with Nealy over his raccoon obsession, Jeff asks his childhood best friend Becca, who is married to Peter, for advice. After drinks at a bar, they walk to Becca and Peter's house nearby. Becca shows Jeff the collectible car that is her husband's pride and joy, and they have sex in the garage. Later, Lila, desperate to talk to Jeff, chases him to his office. Peter is waiting, and confronts Jeff about his affair with Becca, which Lila possibly overhears and she leaves without talking to Jeff.

After work, Jeff visits Lila, who shows him proof that he accidentally poisoned Matthew. Distraught, she tells Jeff that she knows of his affair, and blackmails him into having sex with her immediately. Jeff is unable to disengage before the act is completed, but is confident the chances of Lila becoming pregnant are slim.

Jeff returns home, where Nealy tells him Peter stopped by. Meeting Peter at his restaurant, Jeff is offered the choice between calling Nealy to admit the affair, or paying Peter $100,000.

Rendezvousing with Peter on a bridge, Jeff gives him the $75,000 he was able to get, having taken out a loan. Peter tosses the money into the river and chastises Jeff, warning that if he keeps making the same poor decisions, his life will be ruined. Jeff is inspired to reevaluate his life.

Jeff learns that his friend Lincoln, a basketball star in his youth until a car accident ruined his chances of an athletic scholarship to college, is dying of kidney failure. Determining that he is a perfect organ match, Jeff offers Lincoln a kidney. Recuperating from the surgery, a groggy Jeff is visited by Lila, who giddily reveals she is pregnant with his child. Dazed, Jeff does not immediately react, but later meets Lila in a coffee shop, telling her he will not be a father to the child. Lila says she just wants Jeff to be around for the baby's sake.

Jeff reveals all this to Lincoln, also telling him about a strange dream in which Lila was killed by an arrow. Lincoln, feeling beholden to Jeff for saving his life and landing him a dream job as a basketball coach, takes it upon himself to eliminate Lila. He buys an archery set and hunts her down in a park.

Nealy calls Jeff with news that police are interviewing everyone on their block about Lila's death. Lincoln's church honors Jeff with a special ceremony, during which Jeff shares a silent exchange with Lincoln, knowing he killed Lila. On the way home, a guilt-stricken Jeff tells Nealy everything, but not before he intentionally kills a raccoon crossing the road. A hysterical Nealy laughingly tells Jeff of her own infidelity, and they decide to put everything behind them and start fresh.

Some time later, their grass has been replaced with flowers, solving the raccoon problem, and Nealy is pregnant. Jeff laments that though things have turned out for the better, he will always worry about being found out.

Cast
 Tobey Maguire as Jeff Lang
 Elizabeth Banks as Nealy Lang
 Kerry Washington as Rebecca Mazzoni
 Ray Liotta as Peter Mazzoni
 Laura Linney as Lila
 Dennis Haysbert as Lincoln
 Jonah Hill as The Narrator

Reception
The film has an approval rating of 46% on Rotten Tomatoes, based on 35 reviews. 

Reviewing the film for The New York Times, film critic Stephen Holden commented, "At certain moments, the male characters’ decisions bring to mind those turning points in Woody Allen Crimes and Misdemeanors, when your breath catches in your throat, and your impulse is to cry, 'Oh no!'"  Of Maguire's performance, Reuters said, "the 37-year-old actor is finally growing up on screen." Mick LaSalle of the San Francisco Chronicle wrote, "The Details has a light tone, but it's anything but light in purpose. It's committed and passionate, one of the most perceptive and morally persuasive movies of 2012."

References

External links 
 
 
 

2011 films
2011 comedy-drama films
American independent films
American comedy-drama films
American black comedy films
Films about adultery in the United States
Films about animal cruelty
Films set in Seattle
Films set in Washington (state)
Films shot in Washington (state)
Films shot in Seattle
Films directed by Jacob Aaron Estes
Films scored by Tomandandy
2010s English-language films
2011 black comedy films
2011 independent films
2010s American films